American Specialty Cars (commonly known as ASC or American Sunroof Company) was an automobile supplier of highly engineered and designed roof systems, body systems and other specialty-vehicle systems for the world’s automakers. The company was headquartered in Warren, Michigan, in the United States and was one of several coach convertible builders.  ASC sold assets to its Creative Services division in late 2016 to Roush Industries. In late June 2017, ASC effectively ceased operations, laying off all staff and had tooling and production equipment removed from the manufacturing plant in Lexington, Kentucky.

Founding
The company was founded by Heinz Prechter in Los Angeles, California as the American Sunroof Company in 1965. The company soon expanded its operations into Detroit by 1967. The company first supplied OEM services for the Ford Motor Company's  1968 Mercury Cougar XR-7.

Innovations
In the industry, ASC became well known for converting standard coupe automobiles into convertibles on an OEM basis. The company also engineers convertible tops for automakers to build themselves. Other original-equipment firsts for ASC include the mobile video system (on the Chevrolet Venture) and the powered sunroof.

Currently
The company changed its name from American Sunroof Company, in 2004, to highlight its new corporate focus on being a complete specialty-vehicle development partner for the world’s automakers.

All employees were terminated June 27, 2017 and ASC ceased operations.  Major manufacturing operations were sourced to other suppliers, mainly Toyota and FCA, effectively shutting down production operations.

Products

Recent ASC concepts
ASC Jeep JL Bag Components
ASC Toyota Tacoma Tonneau
ASC RAM Tonneau
ASC / MV-1 Ramp Systems
ASC / Jeep Sky Slider
ASC Cosmos
ASC TriLite
ASC Diamondback
ASC-Suzuki Wave

Past ASC products

Ford Saleen Mustang "Sky Vu" (complete glass convertible conversion)
ASC McLaren Capri (coupe and two-seat convertible)
ASC McLaren Mustang two-seater
Ford EXP
BMW Z3 (OEM Convertible "Topstack" supplier to BMW SC plant
BMW Z4 (OEM convertible hardware with Edscha Cabrio-Verdecksysteme)
Buick GNX (high-performance turbocharger)
Buick Reatta (convertible conversion)
Chevrolet Camaro (convertible conversion)
Chevrolet Corvette (convertible and removable hardtop)
Chevrolet Cavalier (convertible conversion)
Chevrolet SSR (convertible hardtop engineering)
Chrysler 300C Helios (prototype convertible conversion)
Chrysler Cordoba LS (simulated convertible conversion)
Chrysler Executive
Dodge Dakota (convertible conversion)
Dodge Mirada CMX (simulated convertible conversion)
Dodge Shadow (convertible conversion)
Infiniti M (convertible conversion)
Lincoln Continental Mark III (hardtop coupe metal sunroof addition)
Mercury Cougar XR7-G (hardtop coupe metal sunroof addition) 
Mercury Motorsport Capri - body modifications
Mitsubishi 3000GT Spyder (convertible conversion)
Mitsubishi Eclipse Spyder (convertible conversion)
Nissan 240SX (convertible conversion)
Nissan 300ZX (Z32) (convertible conversion )
Pontiac Firebird (convertible and WS6 conversion)
Pontiac Grand Am SC/T (external modifications)
Pontiac Grand Prix Turbo Grand Prix (high-performance turbocharger, body kit)
Pontiac Sunbird (convertible conversion)
Pontiac Sunfire (convertible conversion)
Porsche 944 Convertible (convertible conversion)
Porsche 968 Convertible (convertible conversion)
Saab 900 (convertible prototype)
Rover 800 coupe convertible prototype 1989-1990 
Toyota Camry Solara Convertible (convertible conversion) 
Toyota Celica (convertible conversion)
Toyota Paseo (convertible conversion)
 Victress Car Company (C2 Coupe)

References

Notes
Supplier offers some sunny concepts

External links
ASC Incorporated.
American Sunroof Corporation (West Coast)

Companies based in Wayne County, Michigan
Defunct motor vehicle manufacturers of the United States
Coachbuilders of the United States
Convertible top suppliers
Contract vehicle manufacturers
American companies established in 1965
Defunct manufacturing companies based in Michigan